Milica Mijatović (born 26 June 1991) is a Serbian professional footballer who plays as a striker for Italian Serie A club Fiorentina and the Serbia women's national team. She previously played for Red Star Belgrade in the Serbian 1st League, SFK Sarajevo in the Bosnian Zenska Liga, and Melbourne City in the Australian W-League. In August 2012 she made her debut in the Champions League with BIIK Kazygurt.

Club career
Mijatović signed prior to the 2019–20 W-League season for  Melbourne City where she was a vital player scoring 7 goals when the club finished the season unbeaten and as champions.

In September 2020, Mijatović joined Apollon Limassol on a short term contract to play 2 games in UEFA Champions League.

International career
Mijatović is a member of the Serbian national team.

International goals

References

External links
 

1991 births
Living people
Serbian women's footballers
Serbia women's international footballers
Expatriate women's footballers in Bosnia and Herzegovina
Expatriate women's footballers in Kazakhstan
Serbian expatriate footballers
Serbian expatriate sportspeople in Kazakhstan
Women's association football midfielders
Women's association football forwards
ASPTT Albi players
Melbourne City FC (A-League Women) players
Apollon Ladies F.C. players
Division 1 Féminine players
BIIK Kazygurt players
ŽFK Crvena zvezda players
Fiorentina Women's F.C. players